Maria-Magdalena Kennes (born 23 May 1960) is a former Belgian racing cyclist. She finished in third place in the Belgian National Road Race Championships in 1980.

References

External links

1960 births
Living people
Belgian female cyclists
Place of birth missing (living people)